The 1999 Winnipeg Blue Bombers finished in 4th place in the East Division with a 6–12 record and failed to make the playoffs.

Offseason

CFL Draft

Regular season

Season standings

Season schedule

Awards and records

1999 CFL All-Stars
LB – Maurice Kelley, CFL All-Star

Eastern All-Star Selections
SB – Milt Stegall, CFL Eastern All-Star
WR – Robert Gordon, CFL Eastern All-Star
ST – Wade Miller, CFL Eastern All-Star
LB – Maurice Kelley, CFL Eastern All-Star

References

Winnipeg Blue Bombers
Winnipeg Blue Bombers seasons